Major-General Sir Steuart Welwood Hare,  (September 1867 – October 1952) was a British Army officer.

Military career
Educated at Eton College and the Royal Military College, Sandhurst, Hare was commissioned into the King's Royal Rifle Corps on 5 May 1886. He took part in the Hazara Expedition of 1888, the Miranzai Expedition of 1891, the Isazai Expedition of 1892 and the Chitral Expedition of 1895. He became commander of the 156th (Scottish Rifles) Brigade in August 1912.

Hare commanded 8th Brigade during the landing at Cape Helles and was subsequently wounded in the leg during the Gallipoli campaign of the First World War. He was briefly acting General Officer Commanding 27th Division on the Macedonian front from December 1915. After that he became General Officer Commanding 54th (East Anglian) Division in April 1916 and commanded the division in Egypt and then in the First, Second and Third Battles of Gaza in 1917 and the Battle of Megiddo in September 1918 in Palestine. The division was demobilised in September 1919, but he continued to command it in its newly reconstituted form as a Territorial Army (TA) formation until he retired in July 1923.

He lived at Blairlogie Castle, Blairlogie, Stirlingshire.

Works

References

Bibliography

1867 births
1952 deaths
British Army major generals
Knights Commander of the Order of St Michael and St George
Companions of the Order of the Bath
King's Royal Rifle Corps officers
People educated at Eton College
British military personnel of the Hazara Expedition of 1888
British military personnel of the Chitral Expedition
British Army generals of World War I
Graduates of the Royal Military College, Sandhurst
Military personnel from Portsmouth
People from Gosport